Jordan Johnathan Willis (born May 2, 1995) is an American football defensive end for the Las Vegas Raiders of the National Football League (NFL). He played college football at Kansas State and was drafted by the Cincinnati Bengals in the third round of the 2017 NFL Draft. He has also been a member of the New York Jets.

Early years
Willis attended Rockhurst High School in Kansas City, Missouri. He had 58 tackles and nine sacks as a senior and 60 tackles and 13 sacks as a junior. Willis also served as the student body president as a senior. He committed to Kansas State University to play college football.

College career
As a true freshman at Kansas State in 2013, Willis played in nine games and had one sack. As a sophomore in 2014, he started all 13 games and had 26 tackles and 4.5 sacks. As a junior in 2015, Willis again started all 13 games, recording 36 tackles and 9.5 sacks. As a senior, he was named the Big 12 Defensive Player of the Year after recording 52 tackles and 11.5 sacks.

Professional career

Cincinnati Bengals
Willis was drafted by Cincinnati Bengals in the third round, 73rd overall, in the 2017 NFL Draft.

On September 10, 2019, Willis was released by the Bengals.

New York Jets
On September 11, 2019, Willis was claimed off waivers by the New York Jets.

San Francisco 49ers
On October 27, 2020, Willis was traded to the San Francisco 49ers for a sixth-round pick in 2022. The Jets also sent their 2021 seventh-round pick to the 49ers. Willis was placed on the injured reserve/COVID-19 list by the team on November 23, 2020, and activated on December 2. On January 1, 2021, Willis was placed on injured reserve. He finished the season with a career-high 2.5 sacks.

Willis re-signed with the 49ers on a one-year contract on March 23, 2021. On June 17, Willis was suspended for the first six games of the 2021 season after violating the NFL’s policy on performance-enhancing substances.

On January 22, 2022, in an NFC Divisional Round against the Green Bay Packers at Lambeau Field, with wind chill approaching zero degrees, snow falling, and five minutes remaining in the game, Willis blocked a critical punt by Corey Bojorquez, which was returned for the 49ers' sole touchdown of the game by safety Talanoa Hufanga. That play tied the game 10–10 and allowed the 49ers to win with a field goal from Robbie Gould. For that effort, Jordan was awarded a game ball by 49ers head coach Kyle Shanahan.

On March 23, 2022, Willis re-signed with the 49ers. He was placed on injured reserve on September 14, 2022. He was activated on November 12.

Las Vegas Raiders
On March 20, 2023, Willis signed with the Las Vegas Raiders.

References

External links
 San Francisco 49ers bio
 Kansas State Wildcats bio

1995 births
Living people
Players of American football from San Diego
Players of American football from Kansas City, Missouri
American football defensive ends
American football outside linebackers
Kansas State Wildcats football players
Cincinnati Bengals players
New York Jets players
San Francisco 49ers players